Don Bosco High School, Tinsukia, India, is a private Christian (Roman Catholic) minority institution established and administered by the Salesian Society of Don Bosco, having its provincial headquarters in Dimapur. The school was established under the protection of Article 30(1) of the Indian constitution for the advancement of learning and propagation of the Christian religion.

Objectives
The aim of the institution is to impart religious, mental, moral, social and physical information based on the principles of Christian faith, to members of the Christian community. The method of education followed in the school was practiced by St. John Bosco, based on fear of God, on conviction, prevention of faults and paternal correction.

School uniform
The school uniform consists of:
 White shirt
 Grey shorts or long pants or skirts for girls
 Red tie
 Black shoes and white socks
 Grey sweater(winter)

Prayers
Prayer before Class
Our Father in heaven,/Holy be your name/Your Kingdom come/Your will be done/on earth as in heaven./Give us today/our daily bread/Forgive us our sins/as we forgive those/who sin against us/Do not bring us/to the test/but deliver us/from all evil/Amen.

Prayer after Class
We give you thanks./Almighty God./for all the blessings/we have received/from you/Amen.

Notes

References 

High schools and secondary schools in Assam
Christian schools in Assam
Salesian secondary schools
Catholic secondary schools in India
Tinsukia
Educational institutions established in 1985
1985 establishments in Assam